The Roman Catholic Archdiocese of Cuttack-Bhubaneswar is an archdiocese located in the cities of Cuttack and Bhubaneswar in India.

History
 18 July 1928: Established as Mission “sui iuris” of Cuttack from the Diocese of Vizagapatam
 1 June 1937: Promoted as Diocese of Cuttack
 24 January 1974: Promoted as Metropolitan Archdiocese of Cuttack–Bhubaneswar

Leadership
 Archbishops of Metropolitan See of Cuttack-Bhubaneswar (Latin Rite)
 Archbishop John Barwa SVD 
 Archbishop Raphael Cheenath, S.V.D. (1 July 1985 – 14 August 2016)
 Archbishop Henry Sebastian D'Souza (24 January 1974 – 29 March 1985)
 Bishops of Cuttack (Latin Rite) 
 Bishop Pablo Tobar Gonzáles, C.M. (10 March 1949 – 18 April 1971)
 Bishop Florencio Sanz Esparza, C.M. (11 November 1932 – 4 March 1948)
Ecclesiastical Superiors of Cuttack (Latin Rite) 
 Fr. Valeriano Guemes Rodriguez, C.M. (2 July 1929 – 1932)

Suffragan dioceses
 Balasore 
 Berhampur
 Rayagada
 Rourkela
 Sambalpur

Saints and causes for canonisation
 Blessed Odoric of Pordenone, a Franciscan friar who visited Puri and wrote about the Rath Yatra.
 Servant of God Marian Zelazek, SVD
 Bernard Digal and 6 Lay Companions

Sources
 GCatholic.org
 Catholic Hierarchy

References

Roman Catholic dioceses in India
Christian organizations established in 1928
Roman Catholic dioceses and prelatures established in the 20th century
Christianity in Odisha
Organisations based in Bhubaneswar
Cuttack
1928 establishments in India